The Guánica State Forest, popularly known as the Guánica Dry Forest (Spanish: Bosque seco de Guánica) is a subtropical dry forest located in southwest Puerto Rico. The area was designated as a forest reserve in 1919 and a United Nations Biosphere Reserve in 1981. It is considered the best preserved subtropical dry forest and the best example of dry forest in the Caribbean.

With approximately 10,000 acres, it is the largest of the 20 state forests of Puerto Rico, and it extends over 5 municipalities: Guánica, Guayanilla, Peñuelas, Ponce, and Yauco (although the forest units located in the municipalities of Peñuelas and Ponce only consist of keys and small islands).

History 
The dry forest area of southwestern Puerto Rico protected under the jurisdiction of the Guánica Dry Forest was first established in 1919 as a forest reserve. The United Nations recognized the ecological value of the forest in 1981 when it was designated a Biosphere Reserve, the second in Puerto Rico after El Yunque National Forest (then called the Caribbean National Forest). The forest was given further protections as a nature reserve on October 16, 1985, by the Puerto Rico Planning Board (Spanish: Junta De Planificación), and all provisions from Law No. 133 from 1975 were subsequently applied to the nature reserve.

Geography

Geology 
The dry forest is located on the Southern karst region of Puerto Rico. The soils in the state forest include limestone, fine and soft lime soil which include areas of sand and clay where deciduous plants grow, and sand and clay soils where evergreen plants thrive.

Ecology

The Guánica State Forest is of great natural complexity and scientific importance as it serves as a critical habitat to numerous species of animals and plants that are unique to the region. Its ecosystems include sandy beaches, rocky shores, mangrove forests, seagrass prairies, coral reefs, limestone caverns, saltwater lagoons, salt flats and different types of dry forests (both deciduous and evergreen). 

The last remaining natural population of Puerto Rican crested toads (Peltophryne lemur) can be found in the intermittent freshwater pools which are created by seasonal rains. This species proliferates in the natural conditions created by the karstic geology of the forest, and current efforts by the Association of Zoos and Aquariums (AZA) include breeding programs and projects to release individuals of this species in similar ecosystems in Coamo and in the Northern karst of Puerto Rico.

Fauna 

Approximately half of Puerto Rico's birds and nine of sixteen the endemic bird species occur in the Guánica State Forest. In addition to the Puerto Rican crested toad, other protected animal species in the forest include the Puerto Rican vireo (Vireo latimeri), the Puerto Rican nightjar (Antrostomus noctitherus), the red land crab (Gecarcinus ruricola), and the Mona basket shrimp (Typhlatya monae). The dry forest is also one of the few habitats where the Cook's pallid anole (Anolis cooki) can be found. The coral reefs and maritime areas of the forest reserve are also home to numerous coral, animal and plant species, such as the West Indian manatee which feeds on seaweeds, found in underwater prairies in the reserve.

Flora 
The vegetation in the forest is divided into three main groups: upland deciduous forest (which occupies ), semi-evergreen forest, and scrub forest.  Similar to other insular dry forests species diversity is low; between 30 and 50 tree species are found per hectare. More than 700 plant species, of which 48 are endangered and 16 are endemic to the forest, occur within the forest. Some of the endangered plant species in the forest include the sebucan cactus (Leptocereus quadricostatus), the palo de rosa (Ottoschulzia rhodoxylon), the violeta tree (Polygala cowellii), and the critically endangered bariaco (Trichilia triacantha). One of the most famous plant inhabitants of the forest is an old-growth guaiacwood tree or guayacán (Guaiacum officinale) often called the Guayacán Centenario ("the centenary guaiacwood") which could be as old as 1,000 years-old.

Recreation 
The dry forest is open to visitors and some of its beaches are popular with tourists and locals alike. Fishing and biking are allowed in special designated areas, while scuba diving is also popular in the coral reefs and in the beaches. There are 12 hiking trails with varying difficulties open to visitors and the reserve is also popular for birdwatching.

Gallery

See also

 List of Puerto Rico state forests
 List of National Natural Landmarks in Puerto Rico

References

External links
 Guánica Biosphere Reserve Information from UNESCO

Puerto Rico state forests
Protected areas established in 1919
Biosphere reserves of the United States
Guánica, Puerto Rico
1919 establishments in Puerto Rico